Harry John Seaden (born 23 April 2001) is an English professional footballer who plays as a goalkeeper for Billericay Town.

Club career

Southend United

Seaden joined Southend United at the age of 13 from local youth club Rayleigh Town. In December 2017, Seaden made a single loan appearance for Cambridge City. During the 2017–18 season, Seaden was also loaned to rivals Colchester United, primarily featuring in the club's FA Youth Cup campaign. In 2019, following involvement with Southend's first team squad, Seaden joined Great Wakering Rovers on loan. During the 2019–20 season, Seaden was loaned to both Cambridge City and Dagenham & Redbridge, before making his Southend debut on 18 February 2020 in a 1–0 loss against Gillingham. On 11 February 2022, Seaden left Southend United when his contract was terminated by mutual consent.

Billericay Town
On 22 June 2022, following a trial at Derby County, Seaden signed for Isthmian League side Billericay Town.

International career
Seaden has represented England at under-16 and under-17 level.

Personal life
Seaden's father, John, made 18 Football League appearances for Southend in the 1980s.

Career statistics

References

2001 births
Living people
Association football goalkeepers
English footballers
Sportspeople from Southend-on-Sea
English Football League players
National League (English football) players
Isthmian League players
Southern Football League players
Southend United F.C. players
Cambridge City F.C. players
Colchester United F.C. players
Great Wakering Rovers F.C. players
Dagenham & Redbridge F.C. players
Billericay Town F.C. players
England youth international footballers